Vladimir Aleksandrovich Pozner (24 October 1908 – 31 July 1975) was a Russian-Jewish émigré to the United States. During World War II he spied for Soviet intelligence while he was employed by the US government.

Pozner was born in St. Petersburg. His family fled Soviet Russia after the Bolshevik Revolution, and Vladimir Pozner became a Communist sympathizer while living in Europe. Vladimir Pozner and his family moved to East Berlin and later to Moscow in the early 1950s. There he worked as a senior audio engineer for the Soviet film industry. He retired in 1968, and in 1969 suffered a heart attack. Pozner died on 31 July 1975 during a flight from Paris to Moscow.

Vladimir Pozner's cover name as identified in the Venona project by NSA/FBI analysts was "Platon" or Plato in Russian. Pozner's son, Vladimir Pozner Jr., born in 1934, worked as a journalist and interpreter in the United States, Soviet Union and later in Russia.

References

Venona 
Pozner is referenced in the following Venona project decrypts:
 1131–1133 KGB New York to Moscow, 13 July 1943 
 1930 KGB New York to Moscow, 21 November 1943

External links 
 John Earl Haynes and Harvey Klehr, Venona: Decoding Soviet Espionage in America, New Haven: Yale University Press, c1999, . p. 233; 2000 (c1999), with preview via Google books, p. 362.
  Website of son Vladimir Pozner 

1908 births
1975 deaths
American emigrants to the Soviet Union
American people of Russian-Jewish descent
Russian Jews
Soviet spies against the United States
Venona project
World War II spies for the Soviet Union